The Physicians Act 1540 (32 Hen 8 c 40) was an Act of the Parliament of England.

The whole Act was repealed by section 57(1) of, and Schedule 5 to, the Medical Act 1956.

References
Halsbury's Statutes,

Acts of the Parliament of England (1485–1603)
1540 in law
1540 in England